Kyle Patrick is the second EP by American singer-songwriter Kyle Patrick. It was released online on July 20, 2012.

"Go For Gold!" has been involved in the London Olympics, and has been played on radio in countries such as Singapore, Malaysia and Indonesia.

Track listing

Release history
The EP was released online via PledgeMusic on July 19, 2012, exclusively to fans who had pledged for Patrick's exclusives. It was officially released on Bandcamp and the iTunes Store on July 20, 2012.

Notes
"Baby Don't Board That Plane" was written circa 2009.
"Go For Gold!" was used in London Olympics commercials in Singapore.

References

2012 EPs